The Great Victor Herbert is a 1939 American musical film directed by Andrew L. Stone. During production, the movie was slated to be called The Gay Days of Victor Herbert.

Plot

Cast
 Allan Jones as John Ramsey
 Mary Martin as Louise Hall
 Walter Connolly as Victor Herbert
 Lee Bowman as Dr. Richard Moore
 Susanna Foster as Peggy
 Judith Barrett as Marie Clark
 Jerome Cowan as Barney Harris
 John Garrick as Warner Bryant
 Pierre Watkin as Albert Martin
 Richard Tucker as Michael Brown
 Hal K. Dawson as George Faller
 Emmett Vogan as Forbes
 Mary Currier as Mrs. Victor Herbert
 James Finlayson as Lamplighter

Awards
The film was nominated for three Academy Awards:
 Music (Scoring) - Phil Boutelje, Arthur Lange
 Sound Recording - Loren L. Ryder
 Cinematography – Victor Milner

References

External links
 

1939 films
1939 musical films
American black-and-white films
American musical films
Films about composers
Films about singers
Films directed by Andrew L. Stone
Films scored by Arthur Lange
Paramount Pictures films
1930s English-language films
1930s American films